Annexin A3 is a protein that in humans is encoded by the ANXA3 gene.

It is abnormally expressed in fetuses of both IVF and ICSI, which may contribute to the increase risk of birth defects in these ART.

This gene encodes a member of the annexin family.  Members of this calcium-dependent phospholipid-binding protein family play a role in the regulation of cellular growth and in signal transduction pathways.  This protein functions in the inhibition of phospholipase A2 and cleavage of inositol 1,2-cyclic phosphate to form inositol 1-phosphate. This protein may also play a role in anti-coagulation.

References

External links

Further reading